Thomas Wadley Raoul House, also known as Raoulwood, is a historic home located at Asheville, Buncombe County, North Carolina. It was built in 1923, and is a two-story, hollow tile and wood frame dwelling in the Tudor Revival style.  It is clad in stucco with half-timbering and has a hipped and gable slate roof.  It measures 92 feet, 6 inches long and 20 to 30 feet deep. Also on the property is a contributing servant's cottage (1923) in the Bungalow style.

It was listed on the National Register of Historic Places in 2006.

References

External links 

 Jane Raoul Bingham papers at Stuart A. Rose Manuscript, Archives, and Rare Book Library, Emory University

Houses on the National Register of Historic Places in North Carolina
Tudor Revival architecture in North Carolina
Houses completed in 1923
Houses in Asheville, North Carolina
National Register of Historic Places in Buncombe County, North Carolina